Appleton City Park Historic District is a mostly-residential historic district in Appleton, Wisconsin containing 141 contributing properties built from 1867 to 1949. It was added to the National Register of Historic Places in 2002 for its architectural significance.

References

Historic districts on the National Register of Historic Places in Wisconsin
Queen Anne architecture in Wisconsin
National Register of Historic Places in Outagamie County, Wisconsin